Naulak is a clan of the Zomi people. Its ethnicity lives in Myanmar and India. Most of  The clan of Naulak people are among Dim.

The clan name 'naulak' originated from unaulak. They are Christians and use the ISO basic Latin alphabet and Arabic numerals. Their founding legend states that the tribe's originator was Naulak, who lived in the village of Dimpi in the Ciimnuai-Geltui region of Myanmar. His father was Do El and he had two brothers, Mun Luah and Zil Om.

References

External links 
 NAULAK BEH TANGTHU - Zomi Online Library
 NAULAK INNKUAN LAIBU 2003
 Naulak Innkuan Laibu 2003

Ethnic groups in Manipur
Ethnic groups in Myanmar